El Pedregoso may refer to:
El Pedregoso, Herrera
El Pedregoso, Los Santos